The District Court of South Australia is South Australia's principal trial court. It was established as a court of record by the District Court Act 1991. Prior to that the Court had existed since 1969 under the Local and District Criminal Courts Act 1926.

Jurisdiction and appointment of judges
Judges of the District Court are appointed by the Governor of South Australia on the advice of the Executive Council. Once appointed, they cannot be removed from office except by an address from both houses of the South Australian Parliament. They must retire when they reach the age of 70. Judges of the Employment Court, the Environment, Resources and Development Court, the Licensing Court and the Youth Court, as well as Masters of the Supreme Court, also formally hold office as District Court Judges. They are not listed on this page (except where they have also served as a District Court Judge).

The work of the Court is divided into four areas: civil, criminal, administrative and disciplinary, and criminal injuries. The District Court can hear most civil and criminal matters except for offences related to murder and treason. It also has jurisdiction over criminal injuries compensation claims. In the administrative and disciplinary division, the Court hears appeals from various government agencies, tribunals and disciplinary bodies. The Court is usually constituted of a single judge sitting alone or with a jury (in criminal trials only). In certain cases a judge may sit with two assessors who, with the judge, determine factual questions while the judge determines questions of law. For ceremonial occasions such as the swearing in of a new judge, the Court sits as a Full Court constituted of all available judges.

The main seat of the Court is the Sir Samuel Way Building in Victoria Square, Adelaide (which was originally the Charles Moore and Co. Department store). It also conducts circuits in Mount Gambier, Berri, Port Pirie, Whyalla and Port Lincoln (civil), and Mount Gambier and Port Augusta (criminal).

Current Judges of the District Court
(Date of appointment appears in brackets)

Chief Judge 
Michael Evans (20 December 2016)

Judges

Rauf Soulio (12 October 2006)
Julie McIntyre (25 October 2007)
Paul Cuthbertson (6 August 2009)
Simon Stretton (4 February 2010)
Geraldine Davison (25 June 2012)
Paul Muscat (25 June 2012)
Paul Slattery (25 June 2012)
Joanne Tracey (5 March 2015)
Jane Schammer (12 December 2016)
Liesl Chapman (31 October 2017)
Michael Durrant (28 February 2019)
Jo-Anne Deuter (6 May 2019)
Joana Fuller (10 December 2019)
Michael Burnett (2 February 2020)
Ian Press (20 January 2020)
Karen Thomas (6 October 2020)
Timothy Heffernan (12 April 2021)

Masters
Peter Norman
Mark Blumberg
Elizabeth Olsson

References

External links
 District Court information section and location link
 District Court of South Australia Judgments

South Australian courts and tribunals
1969 establishments in Australia
 
Courts and tribunals established in 1969